Beștemac is a commune in Leova District, Moldova. It is composed of two villages, Beștemac and Pitești.

References

Communes of Leova District